Chesapeake Beach is an unincorporated community in Northumberland County, in the U.S. state of Virginia.

References

Coordinates on Wikidata
Unincorporated communities in Virginia
Unincorporated communities in Northumberland County, Virginia
Virginia populated places on the Chesapeake Bay